Christina Noelle Jones (born September 17, 1987, in Missoula, Montana) is an American competitor in synchronized swimming. She grew up in Fremont, California and lives in Las Vegas, Nevada.

Jones swam with Andrea Nott in the duet event at the 2008 Summer Olympics in Beijing, placing fifth. She also participated on the American team that placed fifth in synchronized team.

At the 2015 World Aquatics Championships, she won a gold medal in the mixed duet technical routine with swim partner Bill May.

Jones is an artist in Cirque du Soleil's water-based show, O.

References

External links
 
 
 
 
 
 

1987 births
Living people
American synchronized swimmers
Olympic synchronized swimmers of the United States
Synchronized swimmers at the 2007 Pan American Games
Synchronized swimmers at the 2008 Summer Olympics
Sportspeople from Missoula, Montana
World Aquatics Championships medalists in synchronised swimming
Synchronized swimmers at the 2015 World Aquatics Championships
Pan American Games competitors for the United States
21st-century American women